New Airport is a metro station on the Orange (North-South) line of the Nagpur Metro serving the Kachore Patil Nagar area of Nagpur. It was opened to the public on 8 March 2019. The station is linked to Wardha Road through a short road.

The Nagpur Metro Rail Corporation Limited (now the Maharashtra Metro Rail Corporation Limited) awarded the contract to construct the station to Infrastructure Leasing & Financial Services (ILFS) in July 2016. Construction of the outer structure of the station was completed by November 2017, and interior work began in the same month. The station was awarded a platinum rating by the Indian Green Building Council, the highest rating the Council presents for sustainable construction practices that reduce environmental impact. Construction of the station was completed by January 2019.

Design
The station's design was modeled on the Sanchi Stupa, and was built in the Indo-Saracenic style fused with features of Buddhist architecture. The station's entrance is a torana, the same structure used as the gateway of the Sanchi Stupa, and has a colonnade on either side. The station facade is made up of stone louvers and cladding. The outer facade features cream-coloured terracotta tiles which help control the temperature inside the station. Solar panels fitted on the station's roof supply around 65% of the total electricity required by the station.

A glass dome is located at a height of 40 meters atop the station. The dome is identical to the dome of the Sanchi Stupa and is topped with a chatra (parasol structure). The New Airport station dome weighs 23 tons, has a diameter of 13.4 meters and a height of 8.5 meters. Around 25 workers and architects worked on the construction of the dome. It was built using glass and stainless steel. It was built on the ground and then lifted atop the station by a crane with a lifting capacity of 200 ton. The dome does not require any routine maintenance, but may have to be monitored in the event of heavy rains. Polycarbonate sheets line the inner side of the dome, preventing damage from ultra violet radiation.

An eight-foot, sandstone sculpture of Buddha is located inside the station underneath the dome.

Station Layout

References

Nagpur Metro stations
Airport rail links in India
Railway stations in India opened in 2019